The subject of mental health in association football has been described as a "stigma" in the sport,  although other professional sports are also affected. Professional footballers suffer more from symptoms of depression and anxiety than the general public.

Examples
After suffering from depression, former England international George Harrison died by suicide at the age of 46.

Agostino Di Bartolomei suffered from clinical depression after retiring from professional football, and eventually committed suicide by shooting himself in his villa in San Marco di Castellabate, on 30 May 1994, ten years to the day after his former club Roma had lost the European Cup final to Liverpool on penalties.

During the first part of the 2000–01 season with Everton, Paul Gascoigne struggled with depression after losing his place in the first team following a series of injuries and a lack of fitness. Later in his career, during his time with Chinese club Gansu Tianma, he went to America in April 2003 for treatment against alcoholism and depression.

Former professional players Robert Enke and Gary Speed have died by suicide; both suffered from depression. Enke threw himself in front of a train. Five years after Enke's death his wife stated that she believed depression in sport was no longer a taboo subject. Speed hanged himself. In September 2018 his wife said that she a discovered a letter written by Speed as a teenager which hinted at his long-term depression. In 2019 a 10-year memorial event for Enke was held a theatre hall in Hannover.

Clarke Carlisle stated that he contemplated suicide after becoming injured early in his career, and in December 2014 attempted suicide due to the severe depression he was suffering from.

Sebastian Deisler was hospitalized after being unable to cope with the pressures of professional football, eventually retiring from the sport at the age of 27.

Jean-Marc Bosman struggled to find work after his judicial challenge of the football transfer rules led to the Bosman ruling in 1995. He ended up living off of welfare, and as a result of his financial difficulties and his claimed ostracism by the world of football, he fell into depression and also struggled with alcoholism.

Adriano struggled with depression and alcoholism following the death of his father in 2004.

In November 2008, Gianluigi Buffon revealed in his autobiography Numero 1 that he had suffered from depression between December 2003 and June 2004, and that he even saw a psychologist during this period in order to overcome it; he later elaborated further on his struggles with depression in 2013. In January 2019, he also revealed that because of his depression, he had suffered from panic attacks during his early career with Juventus, even missing a game as a result during the 2003–04 season.

Ex-player Mickey Bennett set up an organization called Unique Sports Counselling to help footballers deal with mental health issues.

In February 2016 Steve Harper spoke out about his mental health problems while in between clubs. The PFA had to apologise after initially criticising his comments.

In May 2016, professional footballer Chris Mitchell committed suicide. In October 2018 his family spoke out about his struggles with mental health.

In May 2017, Aaron Lennon was detained under the Mental Health Act, and he received treatment for a "stress-related illness". In March 2019 he spoke about the incident, and said that other players had asked him for advice.

In June 2017, Steven Caulker spoke about his struggles with depression, and his addiction to alcohol and gambling.

In February 2018 David Cox stated that he had been mocked by both players and fans for discussing his mental health problems.

In March 2018, the UK government announced plans to deal with mental health in professional sports. Later that month, Harry Smith released a statement stating that he was seeking help for mental health and gambling addiction problems. That same month, Danish player Jannik Skov Hansen talked about the depression and suicidal thoughts he had experienced earlier in his career.

In April 2018 The Secret Footballer, an anonymous former Premier League player, talked about his depression.

In May 2018, Andrés Iniesta revealed that he suffered from depression before the 2010 FIFA World Cup due to his injuries and the death of his friend Daniel Jarque.

In June 2018, England international Danny Rose stated that he had been diagnosed with depression.

In September 2018, professional footballer Marvin Sordell suggested that clubs should have full-time counsellors to assist players with depression and other mental health issues. When Sordell retired from football in July 2019 he cited his mental health. Later that month Anthony Knockaert also revealed his struggles with mental health issues, as did David Cotterill.

In October 2018, Michael Carrick announced that he had suffered from depression for 2 years following the defeat in the 2009 UEFA Champions League Final. Later that month Christian Nadé revealed that he had tried to commit suicide in 2014 following struggles with depression.

In June 2019, former player Emmanuel Eboué spoke about his ongoing struggles with mental health. In August 2019 Martin Ling discussed his mental health problems.

Billy Kee has spoken publicly about his struggles with anxiety and depression, which led him to considering giving up football. In September 2019 it was revealed that Kee was seeking treatment for depression, anxiety, and bulimia. During that same month, the English Football League announced a scheme in conjunction with mental health charity Mind called 'Get Set to Go'. This included a series of street art pieces to raise awareness about mental health. Later that month, Motherwell manager Stephen Robinson said clubs had a duty of care in relation to players' mental well-being if they were injured. Kee announced his retirement from professional football on 29 January 2020 due to mental health.

In October 2019, Francesco Acerbi revealed that during his time with Milan he had suffered from depression following the death of his father, and fell into alcoholism as a result of the loss and his personal struggles.

In November 2019 Prince William met with West Bromwich Albion players to discuss the importance of mental health.

In December 2019 ex-professional Rhodri Jones spoke out about the pressures that young players face.

The kick-offs for all third-round FA Cup matches over the weekend of 4 and 5 January 2020 were delayed by 60 seconds to promote a film narrated by Prince William about mental health. That same weekend ex-player Paul Merson spoke about his struggles with mental health. Later that month former player Brian Lenihan revealed that he retired from professional football at the age of 23 mental health issues.

For the 2020–21 season, Newport County appointed Kevin Ellison as their 'mental health ambassador'. In June 2018 he has publicly talked about his struggles with depression, giving advice to fellow professionals.

In January 2021, Cheltenham Town captain Ben Tozer spoke about his previous struggles with anxiety, which led him to nearly quitting the game. That same month Jordan Ibe revealed that he was suffering with depression, describing himself as being in a "dark place".

In April 2021, Scottish footballer David Cox retired in the middle of a match, leaving the stadium at the half-time break, after alleged comments from opposition player Jonathan Tiffoney related to Cox's mental health.

In January 2022, Josip Iličić missed game time due to mental health issues.

In February 2022 former players Chris Sutton and Micah Richards spoke about mental health issues in their playing days.

In March 2022, Paul Pogba said that he had suffered from depression whilst being managed by Jose Mourinho at Manchester United during 2018.

In May 2022 Dominic Calvert-Lewin spoke out about his mental health problems.

In October 2022, Steven Reid revealed that he had left his job as Nottingham Forest assistant manager in order to begin studying to qualify as a counsellor.

In November 2022, Prince William and footballers Harry Kane and Declan Rice discussed mental health for the BBC, in an effort to raise awareness.

Millie Farrow has struggled with obsessive compulsive disorder throughout her career. In 2023, she released a book called Brave Enough Not To Quit, which details how she deals with her OCD and anxiety.

In February 2023, French national team player Wendie Renard announced that she would not play at the 2023 FIFA Women's World Cup in order to "preserve" her "mental health"; teammates Kadidiatou Diani and Marie-Antoinette Katoto also announced their retirement from the national team.

See also
Mental health in the Australian Football League

References

Specific

General

Mental health
Mental health
Mental health
Association football